"Ay, Dios Mío!" (Spanish for "Oh My God!", stylized as "Ay, DiOs Mío!) is a song by Colombian singer-songwriter Karol G. It was written by Karol G, Danny Ocean and Ovy on the Drums, and produced by the latter.  The song was released on July 9, 2020 through Universal Music Latino, as the second single from her third studio album KG0516.

Background 

Hours prior to its release Karol G announced the release of "Ay, Díos Mío" via her social media platforms with an accompanying music video scheduled for release that same day. The song was released on July 9, 2020.

On an interview with Billboard Giraldo revealed how the song was inspired by her then partner Anuel AA: "In this song I’ll tell the story of how I met Ema. The song starts from the moment Ema first wrote me a DM on Instagram […] until the day we met and went out. And when we went out, in the middle of dancing, and whether I’d go home with him or not."

Critical reception 

Billboard stated "It’s her own, very personal, and feminine, take on reggaeton; a Karol G stamp that makes her stand out in the genre."

Commercial performance 

"Ay, Dios Mío!" debuted and peaked at number 94 on the US Billboard Hot 100 chart dated October 10, 2020.
The song debuted at number 27  on the Billboard Hot Latin Songs chart dated July 25, 2020. It peaked at number 5 on the chart dated September 12, 2020. The song received a Latin diamond certification by the Recording Industry Association of America (RIAA) on April 1, 2021, for sales of 600,000 equivalent-units.

Awards and nominations

Music video
The music video for "Ay, Dios Mío" was directed by Mike Ho and was released on Karol G's YouTube channel on July 9, 2020.

Charts

Weekly charts

Year-end charts

Certifications

Release history

See also
List of Billboard number-one Latin songs of 2020

References

2020 songs
2020 singles
Karol G songs
Spanish-language songs
Song recordings produced by Ovy on the Drums